Wüstite (FeO) is a mineral form of iron(II) oxide found with meteorites and native iron. It has a grey colour with a greenish tint in reflected light. Wüstite crystallizes in the isometric-hexoctahedral crystal system in opaque to translucent metallic grains. It has a Mohs hardness of 5 to 5.5 and a specific gravity of 5.88. Wüstite is a typical example of a non-stoichiometric compound.

Wüstite was named after Fritz Wüst (1860–1938), a German metallurgist and founding director of the Kaiser-Wilhelm-Institut für Eisenforschung (presently Max Planck Institute for Iron Research GmbH).

In addition to its type locality in Germany, it has been reported from Disko Island, Greenland; the Jharia coalfield, Jharkhand, India; and as inclusions in diamonds in a number of kimberlite pipes. It also is reported from deep sea manganese nodules.

Its presence indicates a highly reducing environment.

Wüstite redox buffer 

Iron minerals on the earth's surface are typically richly oxidized, forming hematite, with Fe3+ state, or in somewhat less oxidizing environments, magnetite, with a mixture of Fe3+ and Fe2+. Wüstite, in geochemistry, defines a redox buffer of oxidation within rocks at which point the rock is so reduced that Fe3+, and thus hematite, is absent.

As the redox state of a rock is further reduced, magnetite is converted to wüstite. This occurs by conversion of the Fe3+ ions in magnetite to Fe2+ ions. An example reaction is presented below:
\underset{magnetite}{FeO.Fe2O3} + \underset{graphite/diamond}{C} -> {3FeO} + \underset{carbon\ monoxide}{CO}

The formula for magnetite is more accurately written as FeO·Fe2O3 than as Fe3O4. Magnetite is one part FeO and one part Fe2O3, rather than a solid solution of wüstite and hematite. The magnetite is termed a redox buffer because until all Fe3+ magnetite is converted to Fe2+ the oxide mineral assemblage of iron remains wüstite-magnetite, and furthermore the redox state of the rock remains at the same level of oxygen fugacity. This is similar to buffering in the H+/OH− acid–base system of water.

Once the Fe3+ is consumed, then oxygen must be stripped from the system to further reduce it and wüstite is converted to native iron. The oxide mineral equilibrium assemblage of the rock becomes wüstite–magnetite–iron.

In nature, the only natural systems which are chemically reduced enough to even attain a wüstite–magnetite composition are rare, including carbonate-rich skarns, meteorites, fulgurites and lightning-affected rock, and perhaps the mantle where reduced carbon is present, exemplified by the presence of diamond or graphite.

Effects upon silicate minerals 

The ratio of Fe2+ to Fe3+ within a rock determines, in part, the silicate mineral assemblage of the rock. Within a rock of a given chemical composition, iron enters minerals based on the bulk chemical composition and the mineral phases which are stable at that temperature and pressure. Iron may only enter minerals such as pyroxene and olivine if it is present as Fe2+; Fe3+ cannot enter the lattice of fayalite olivine and thus for every two Fe3+ ions, one Fe2+ is used and one molecule of magnetite is created.

In chemically reduced rocks, magnetite may be absent due to the propensity of iron to enter olivine, and wüstite may only be present if there is an excess of iron above what can be used by silica. Thus, wüstite may only be found in silica-undersaturated compositions which are also heavily chemically reduced, satisfying both the need to remove all Fe3+ and to maintain iron outside of silicate minerals.

In nature, carbonate rocks, potentially carbonatite, kimberlites, carbonate-bearing melilitic rocks, and other rare alkaline rocks may satisfy these criteria. However, wüstite is not reported in most of these rocks in nature, potentially because the redox state necessary to drive magnetite to wüstite is so rare.

Role in nitrogen fixation

Approximately 2-3% of the world's energy budget is allocated to the Haber process for ammonia production, which relies on wüstite-derived catalysts. The industrial catalyst is derived from finely ground iron powder, which is usually obtained by reduction of high-purity magnetite (Fe3O4). The pulverized iron metal is burnt (oxidized) to give magnetite or wüstite of a defined particle size. The magnetite (or wüstite) particles are then partially reduced, removing some of the oxygen in the process. The resulting catalyst particles consist of a core of magnetite, encased in a shell of wüstite, which in turn is surrounded by an outer shell of iron metal. The catalyst maintains most of its bulk volume during the reduction, resulting in a highly porous high-surface-area material, which enhances its effectiveness as a catalyst.

Historical use
According to Vagn Fabritius Buchwald, wüstite was an important component during the Iron Age to facilitate the process of forge welding. In ancient times, when blacksmithing was performed using a charcoal forge, the deep charcoal pit in which the steel or iron was placed provided a highly reducing, virtually oxygen-free environment, producing a thin wüstite layer on the metal. At the welding temperature, the iron becomes highly reactive with oxygen, and will spark and form thick layers of slag when exposed to the air, which makes welding the iron or steel nearly impossible. To solve this problem, ancient blacksmiths would toss small amounts of sand onto the white-hot metal. The silica in the sand reacts with the wüstite to form fayalite, which melts just below the welding temperature. This produced an effective flux that shielded the metal from oxygen and helped extract oxides and impurities, leaving a pure surface that can weld readily. Although the ancients had no knowledge of how this worked, the ability to weld iron contributed to the movement out of the Bronze Age and into the modern.

Related minerals 
Wüstite forms a solid solution with periclase (MgO), and iron substitutes for magnesium. Periclase, when hydrated, forms brucite (Mg(OH)2), a common product of serpentinite metamorphic reactions.

Oxidation and hydration of wüstite forms goethite and limonite.

Zinc, aluminium, and other metals may substitute for iron in wüstite.

Wüstite in dolomite skarns may be related to siderite (iron(II) carbonate), wollastonite, enstatite, diopside, and magnesite.

See also 
 Normative mineralogy
 Skarn

References

Mineral Data Pub. PDF file Accessed 3/5/2006
Euromin Accessed 3/5/2006
Wüstite on Mindat.org Accessed 3/5/2006
Webmineral data Accessed 3/5/2006

Cubic minerals
Iron(II) minerals
Minerals in space group 225
Non-stoichiometric compounds
Oxide minerals